1999 JU Anti-Rape Movement is a series of student protests against the culture of rape and sexual harassment in the Jahangirnagar University of Bangladesh. The movement initiated in 1998 when Bangladesh Chhatra League activists celebrated the 100th rape of women by their leader Jasimuddin Manik, who was the General Secretary of Jahangirnagar University unit of Bangladesh Chhatra League. After a year-long protests dominated by female students, on August 2, 1999, Jasimuddin Manik and his armed cadres, accused of numerous rape and sexual harassments inside the campus were ousted from the university.

Background 

In 1996, Bangladesh Awami League was elected to power after 21 years. After that, activists of Awami League's student wing, Bangladesh Chhatra League captured most of the university dormitories of Bangladesh and were dominating in the campus area because of the leniency of university authorities, Jahangirnagar University an institution in the suburb of capital Dhaka was no exception. 

In 1998, after the murder of a Bangladesh Chatra League activist Anand Kumar Ghosh, 9 leaders of the organization was expelled by the central committee. The committee also installed Jasimuddin Manik, an alleged rapist, in charge of the General Secretary of Jahangirnagar University unit of Bangladesh Chhatra League. Using the muscle power and political backing from Awami League, Jasimuddin Manik, a student of Drama and Dramatics department of the university and the newly appointed General Secretary of the Jahangirnagar University unit of Bangladesh Chhatra League, and his followers started raping and harassing female students and local girls. Manik and his followers were widely known as "Rapist Group" in the campus.

In August 1998 Manabzamin a national daily of Bangladesh, brought the incidents of rape in Jahangirnagar University in light when they reported the rape of three female students in the campus by Bangladesh Chhatra League activists. This led to a series of protests in the campus.

Protests 

On 19 August 1998, the first major protest against the culture of rape and sexual harassment by Bangladesh Chhatra League leader and activists in Jahangirnagar University. A series of rallies and protests continued after that. The students of the university formed Jahangirnagar University General Students Unity in September 1998 and forced the authorities to form a committee to investigate the incidents of sexual harassment in Jahangirnagar University.

On 27 September 1998, the fact-finding committee found at least 20 confirmed cases of rape and 300 cases of sexual harassment inside the campus at different locations. The committee also found that, the kingpin of Bangladesh Chhatra League rapists, Jasimuddin Manik threw a cocktail party and offered sweets to his fellow Bangladesh Chhatra League activists on completion of his 100th rape. 

After knowing this, the enraged students continued protesting and demanded the expulsion of accused Bangladesh Chhatra League leaders as well as urged the authority to file case against them. The university expelled Jasimuddin Manik for life, but his followers got away with temporary suspensions ranging from one year to three year. The Vice-Chancellor of the university, Professor Alauddin Ahmed however refused to take any legal action against the accused including Jasimuddin Manik. A group of university teachers led by Professor Anu Muhammad termed this act as providing "license to rape". 

After the protests, the rival group of Manik and his followers snatched away the control of the dormitories from them and ousted them from the campus, in October 1998. Manik and his men, because no case was filed against them, remained at large.

However, Manik and his men stormed into the campus in July 1999 with firearms and took back the control of the dormitories under the nose of the authorities loyal to Awami League government. 

On August 2, 1999, general students of the university who were previously united under the Jahangirnagar University General Students Unity, organized a mass protest and stormed into the dormitories where Manik and his men were residing. The perpetrators known as the "Rapist Group" were ousted again from the campus that day, never to return.

On August 5 of 1999, students of Jahangirnagar University formed a human-chain on the Dhaka-Aricha Highway demanding punishment of the rapists.

Aftermath 

No cases were filled against the rapists on behalf of the university authority or Awami League government and none of the culprits were tried for the heinous crime.

Mir Mehedi Hasan Titu, one of the followers of Manik and a member of the "Rapist Group", assaulted one of the leading figures of the movement Professor Rehnuma Ahmed on September 3 of 1999. He was expelled for two years after that. However, he contested in the Jahangirnagar University senate election from pro-Awami League panel in December 2017. 

The university administration led by Professor Alauddin Ahmed later in October 2001 expelled seven activists of left-leaning organizations for organizing the movement and 52 others were asked to show cause why the university should not expel them. The action was however declared invalid by the High Court.

Even after two decades, Bangladesh Chhatra League men often boast of their ability to rape and threaten girls online referring to Jasimuddin Manik and his rapist group.

References 

Jahangirnagar University
Rape in Bangladesh
Politics of Bangladesh
Bangladesh Awami League
1999 in Bangladesh